The Garrett Subdivision is a railroad line owned and operated by CSX Transportation in the U.S. states of Ohio and Indiana. The line runs from Deshler, Ohio, west to Willow Creek, Indiana (in Portage), along a former Baltimore and Ohio Railroad (B&O) line. At its east end, just east of Deshler, the Garrett Subdivision becomes the Willard Subdivision. The line crosses the Toledo Subdivision at Deshler and ends at the junction with the Porter Subdivision and Barr Subdivision at Willow Creek.

History
The line was opened by the Baltimore, Pittsburgh and Chicago Railway in 1874. It became part of the B&O and CSX through leases and mergers.

Derailments occurred on the line in 2002, 2010, on January 6, 2012 (near Portage, Indiana) and on April 22, 2014 (near St. Joseph, Indiana).

References

CSX Transportation lines
Rail infrastructure in Ohio
Rail infrastructure in Indiana
Baltimore and Ohio Railroad lines
1874 establishments in Ohio
1874 establishments in Indiana